Värmland County (Värmlands län) is a county or län in west central Sweden. It borders the Swedish counties of Dalarna, Örebro and Västra Götaland, as well as the Norwegian counties of Viken and Innlandet to the west. Prince Carl Philip is Duke of Värmland.

Province 

The county has more or less the same boundaries as Värmland Province, except that the municipalities of Karlskoga and Degerfors are part of Örebro County.

Administration 

Värmland County was formed in 1779, when it was separated from Närke and Värmland County.

The main aim of the County Administrative Board is to fulfil the goals set in  national politics by the Riksdag and the Government, to coordinate the interests of the county, to promote the development of the county, to establish regional goals and safeguard the due process of law in the handling of each case. The County Administrative Board is a Government Agency headed by a Governor. See List of Värmland Governors.

Politics 

The County Council of Värmland is called Region Värmland.

Riksdag elections 
The table details all Riksdag election results of Värmland County since the unicameral era began in 1970. The blocs denote which party would support the Prime Minister or the lead opposition party towards the end of the elected parliament.

Municipalities 

In Värmland Province:
Arvika
Eda
Filipstad
Forshaga
Grums
Hagfors
Hammarö
Karlstad
Kil
Kristinehamn
Munkfors
Storfors
Sunne
Säffle
Torsby
Årjäng

Demographics

Foreign background 
SCB have collected statistics on backgrounds of residents since 2002. These tables consist of all who have two foreign-born parents or are born abroad themselves. The chart lists election years and the last year on record alone.

Climate
Värmland being a landlocked county results in greater temperature differences than at the nearby west coast of Sweden and south coast of Norway. As a result, the southern areas of the county has a humid continental climate with strong oceanic influences. The latter climate type is prevalent in a small area at the shores of Lake Vänern due to recent warming. More northerly areas see a subarctic climate with relatively mild winters for the climate type. The subarctic classification of areas such as Hagfors and Torsby is more due to the cool summer nights that renders September below  in mean temperatures.

Heraldry 
The county of Värmland inherited its coat of arms from the province of the same name. When it is shown with a royal crown it represents the County Administrative Board. Blazon: "Argent, an Eagle displayed Azure beaked, langued and membered Gules."

See also 
Duke of Värmland, a title for members of the royal family (see Duchies in Sweden)The title is presently held by Prince Carl Philip, Duke of Värmland
Egenäs

References and notes

External links 
Värmland County Administrative Board
Värmland County Council
Värmland Regional Association
Heraldry of Värmland

 

 
Counties of Sweden
Värmland
States and territories established in 1779
1779 establishments in Sweden